Robin St. Clair Rimington Hardy (2 October 1929 – 1 July 2016) was an English author and film director. His most famous directorial work is The Wicker Man, and his last project was a film adaptation of his novel Cowboys for Christ, which was retitled The Wicker Tree.

Biography
He was born in Wimbledon, London, England and studied art in Paris. He worked in the U.S., where he made television dramas. He was a partner in a film company with Anthony Shaffer for 13 years. He returned to London where he made television commercials. Later he wrote historical novels and was involved in creating historical theme parks in the U.S. In addition to Cowboys for Christ, Hardy published a novelization of The Wicker Man, as well as the novel The Education of Don Juan.

Hardy died in Reading on 1 July 2016; he was survived by his fifth wife, Victoria Webster (married 2000), and eight children.

Hardy had expressed interest in producing a finale to his loose Wicker Man trilogy titled The Wrath of the Gods. A crowdfunding campaign was set-up in 2015 to raise funds for the film's production, but ultimately fell short of its US$210,000 target.

Filmography
The Wicker Man (1973) (director)
The Fantasist (1986) (writer and director)
The Bulldance (1989) (writer)
The Wicker Tree (2011) (writer and director)

References

External links

Interview in MungBeing Magazine

1929 births
2016 deaths
English film directors
English screenwriters
English male screenwriters
British male novelists
Horror film directors
People from Surrey